The Terepaima National Park Is a protected area with the status of national park in the South American country of Venezuela located in the mountainous region of the Lara and Portuguesa States. Specifically southeast of the city of Barquisimeto, capital of the Lara State, it covers areas belonging to the municipalities Iribarren, Palavecino and Simón Planas.

It was decreed National Park on April 14, 1976 with the purpose of protecting the flora and fauna of the region. It has an area of 18,971 hectares.

Its temperature varies between 19 and 26 degrees Celsius. Its vegetation in the highest parts is of cloud forest with the presence of trees such as mountaineers, salvio and mountain manzanita, as well as several species of ferns.

In the park there are several endangered species such as the front and jaguar bear, other mammals such as cachicamos, lapas, rabipelados, monkeys araguatos, capuchin monkeys, mapurites, cunaguaros, deer, dantas, bears meleros, pumas And báquiros.

The predominant birds are tortolites, guacharaca, tufted paují, white moriche, cristofué, paraulata llanera,  and paují copete of stone, among others.

You can also find reptile species such as the rattlesnake, the mapanare and the hunting tigra.

See also
List of national parks of Venezuela
Mochima National Park

References

National parks of Venezuela
Protected areas established in 1976
Geography of Lara (state)
Geography of Portuguesa (state)
Tourist attractions in Portuguesa (state)
Tourist attractions in Lara (state)
1976 establishments in Venezuela